Like Father Like Son is a 1987 American fantasy-comedy film starring Dudley Moore and Kirk Cameron.

Plot
Chris Hammond is a high school senior. He likes a girl at school (Lori) who happens to be dating his rival and bully Rick. His father, Jack, is a very successful surgeon and working hard to get a promotion to the position of the chief of staff at his hospital. He also wants his son to become a doctor as well, but Chris is not interested. Chris's friend, Clarence "Trigger", whose Uncle Earl had been bitten by a snake while in the desert. Earl had his leg fixed by Native Americans with a body-switching potion called the "Brain-Transference Serum". Trigger shows Chris how the Brain-Transference Serum works by trying it out on Chris' cat and dog, and the pets switch bodies. Trigger brought the Brain Transference Serum in a Tabasco sauce bottle, and the Hammond's housekeeper Phyllis finds the bottle and puts it in the food cupboard. Jack unwittingly puts it in his Bloody Mary. The serum works by someone ingesting it, then the next person that looks into their eyes switches bodies with them. As Jack looks into his son's eyes while having a disagreement over a C grade on an important test, the father and son switch bodies.

Trigger states he will get in contact with his Uncle Earl in order to find a way for the two to switch back, but Earl has just left for another trip. Chris goes to town in his dad's body, using his dad's credit card to shop and party with Trigger along for the ride. He bumps into his dad's boss's wife while out in a bar, but he does not realize who she is. She comes on to him and he accepts. In the morning Jack in his son's body and Chris in his father's body woke up screaming and realize they are not dreaming. Jack is upset that Chris got drunk in his body and chews him out and tries to punish him for it. The next day Jack goes to school in Chris's place and Chris cannot leave the house or go to Jack's job. Chris called Jack's office to call in sick for a few days. Jack's boss Larry goes to Jack's house to check on him and sees him feeling better. Jack gets called in to work at the private hospital where his dad works, and he ends up handing out a bunch of pills to patients while doing rounds. He also seconds a motion proposed by his dad's colleague, suggesting that the hospital could treat patients with no insurance; in Chris' words, the hospital should "screw the insurance".

Meanwhile, Jack has problems of his own in Chris' body. At school, his knowledge of the schoolwork and his willingness to point out troublemakers in class has him shunned by his fellow students. He takes his son's girlfriend Lori to a concert, but does not enjoy himself, finding the music too loud. He fails to perform at the big relay race, dropping the baton and attempting to dive to the finish line and coming up far short. Rick later beats him up because of the track meet and taking Lori out.

They finally get in touch with Earl, who explains that they can get the antidote if they go on a trip to Death Valley. After a few hiccups they finally find the key ingredient for the antidote. Trigger's uncle Earl makes it up and they drink it; however looking into each other's eyes, does not immediately work. Earl explains it can sometimes take a while to work. It finally works as Jack in Chris' body is running late for a meeting; he slips on the wet floor and knocks a woman out of the window at school. Chris in Jack's body is on his way to a meeting about his dad becoming Chief of Staff at the hospital, which will not happen now that Jack's boss found out what Chris did with his wife while in Jack's body. Now back in their own bodies, both of them race to the hospital, although Chris takes time to knock out Rick. They go in Jack's car, wrecking it along the way. Chris speaks up at the Chief of Staff meeting to try to persuade his dad's boss to give his dad the job, but his boss will not hear it. Jack walks in at this point and says he does not want the chief of staff job anymore; he would much rather spend the overtime with his son instead. They go home, but on the way out, Trigger sees Rick and gives him the Brain-Transference Serum. The next person that looks into his eyes is none other than Jack's employer; Dr. Larry Armbruster. The film end as they both scream after they switch bodies.

Cast
 Dudley Moore as Jack Hammond
 Kirk Cameron as Chris Hammond
 Margaret Colin as Ginnie Armbruster
 Catherine Hicks as Dr. Amy Larkin
 Patrick O'Neal as Dr. Larry Armbruster
 Sean Astin as Clarence / Trigger
 Camille Cooper as Lori Beaumont
 Micah Grant as Rick Anderson
 Bill Morrison as Uncle Earl
 Skeeter Vaughan as Medicine Man
 Larry Sellers as Navajo Helper
 Tami David as Navajo Girl
 Graeme MacDonald as Navajo Boy
 Maxine Stuart as Phyllis, Hammonds' Housekeeper
 David Wohl as Dr. Roger Hartwood
 Michael Horton as Dr. Mike O'Donald
 Bonnie Bedelia (uncredited) as Lady with Gum in Hair

Reception
The film received negative reviews, particularly by famed movie critics Gene Siskel and Roger Ebert. Ebert called it "one of the most desperately bad comedies I've ever seen", but Siskel showed even more aggressive derision and hatred towards the film, calling it a "cheap marketing decision masquerading as a comedy".

Motion picture-historian Leonard Maltin seemed to agree, declaring the film a "BOMB" and adding that "Dudley Moore's mugging talents get a major workout in this hall-of-fame embarrassment."

Conversely, Caryn James of The New York Times wrote that "Dudley Moore and Kirk Cameron are so clever and charming as the mismatched pair that they turn a potential dud into a sweetly engaging film", though she added that "it never fulfills its potential for being a shrewd satire of cross-generational manners".

Box office
The film debuted at No. 2 behind Fatal Attraction.

Soundtrack
 Autograph - "Dance All Night"
 Autograph - "She Never Looked That Good for Me"
 Marc Jordan - "I Ching"
 The Fabulous Thunderbirds - "It Comes to Me Naturally"
 Omar & the Howlers - "Hard Times in the Land of Plenty"
 Wang Chung - "Everybody Have Fun Tonight"
 Aerosmith - "Dude (Looks Like a Lady)"
 Ramones - "Somebody Put Something in My Drink"
 Mötley Crüe - "All in the Name of..."
 Mötley Crüe - "Wild Side"

Home media
Like Father Like Son was released on VHS in 1988 and re-released in 1991. The DVD was released by Columbia TriStar Home Entertainment in 2004. The Double Feature 2-DVD Set with the film and Vice Versa by Columbia Pictures was released on October 7, 2008 by Sony Pictures Home Entertainment.

References

External links
 
 
 
 
 

1980s fantasy comedy films
1980s teen comedy films
1987 comedy films
1987 films
American fantasy comedy films
American teen comedy films
Body swapping in films
1980s English-language films
Films directed by Rod Daniel
Films produced by Brian Grazer
Films produced by David Valdes
Films scored by Miles Goodman
Films set in California
Films shot in California
Films about rapid human age change
Imagine Entertainment films
TriStar Pictures films
Films about father–son relationships
1980s American films